Piano Sonata No. 14 may refer to: 
Piano Sonata No. 14 (Beethoven), commonly known as the Moonlight Sonata
Piano Sonata No. 14 (Mozart)